This article includes the videography of Prince. See Prince discography for his discography.

Prince was an extremely prolific artist, having released several hundred songs both under his own name and under pseudonyms and/or pen names, as well as writing songs which have been recorded by other artists. Estimates of the actual number of songs written by Prince (released and unreleased) range anywhere from five hundred to well over one thousand. Prince has sold over 150 million records worldwide, including 39.5 million certified units in the United States, 4.7 million in France and over 10 million records in the United Kingdom.

Music videos

Notes

Video albums

A With The Revolution
B With The New Power Generation

Filmography

See also
 Prince albums discography
 Prince singles discography

References

 Uptown: The Vault – The Definitive Guide to the Musical World of Prince: Nilsen Publishing 2004,

External links
 Guide2Prince Worldwide Prince discography
 Review of Prince's albums
 
 The Digital Garden List of unofficial Prince recordings

 
Prince
Prince